Zasukhonskaya is a rural locality (a village) in Nizhneslobodskoye Rural Settlement, Vozhegodsky District, Vologda Oblast, Russia. The population was 30 as of 2002.

Geography 
Zasukhonskaya is located 49 km east of Vozhega (the district's administrative centre) by road. Okulovskaya is the nearest rural locality.

References 

Rural localities in Vozhegodsky District